Bushranging in North Queensland is a 1904 short film by the Limelight Department of the Salvation Army in Australia. It was Australia's first bushranging drama shot on film. It was shot near Winton, Queensland.

Plot
The coach "bailed up" by Winton bushrangers, robbing of the passengers, shooting of the gang by the coach driver.

References

1904 films
1900s Australian films
1904 Western (genre) films
Australian black-and-white films
Bushranger films
Films set in colonial Australia
Limelight Department films
Silent Australian Western (genre) films
Silent drama films